Region 4 is the name of a Statistics Canada census division, one of six in the Northwest Territories, Canada. It was introduced in the 2011 census, along with Regions 1, 2, 3, 5, and 6, resulting in the abolition of the former census divisions of Fort Smith Region and Inuvik Region (the latter not to be confused with the modern-day administrative region of the same name). Unlike in some other provinces, census divisions do not reflect the organization of local government in the Northwest Territories. These areas exist solely for the purposes of statistical analysis and presentation; they have no government of their own.

Its territory coincides roughly with the Dehcho Region and the extreme western part of South Slave Region that is centered on Fort Providence, west of Great Slave Lake.

Main languages in the Region include English (62.8%), Slavey (33.6%) and Dene (1.7%).

Demographics 

Communities

Village
Fort Simpson
Hamlets
Fort Liard
Fort Providence
Settlements
Jean Marie River
Kakisa
Nahanni Butte
Trout Lake
Wrigley
Indian reserve
Hay River Reserve (Hay River Dene)

References

Dehcho Region
South Slave Region
Census divisions of the Canadian territories